Bessarion ("Soso") Chedia (born 9 October 1965) is a Georgian professional football coach and a former player.

Career
He made his professional debut in the Soviet First League in 1982 for FC Guria Lanchkhuti.

Honours
 Umaglesi Liga champion: 1990.

References

1965 births
Living people
Soviet footballers
Footballers from Georgia (country)
Georgia (country) international footballers
Soviet Top League players
Soviet First League players
Erovnuli Liga players
Russian Premier League players
Cypriot First Division players
Allsvenskan players
FC Guria Lanchkhuti players
FC Dinamo Tbilisi players
Olympiakos Nicosia players
FC KAMAZ Naberezhnye Chelny players
Dyskobolia Grodzisk Wielkopolski players
FC Zugdidi players
GIF Sundsvall players
Expatriate footballers in Poland
Expatriate sportspeople from Georgia (country) in Poland
Expatriate sportspeople from Georgia (country) in Sweden
Expatriate sportspeople from Georgia (country) in Cyprus
Expatriate sportspeople from Georgia (country) in Russia
Expatriate footballers in Cyprus
Expatriate footballers in Sweden
FC Zugdidi managers
AEK F.C. non-playing staff
Association football defenders
Football managers from Georgia (country)